DerMarr Miles Johnson (born May 5, 1980) is an American basketball assistant coach at West Virginia and retired professional basketball player who played seven seasons in the NBA.

College career
Johnson was a consensus McDonald's, Parade Magazine and USA Today high school All-American as well as Parade's National High School Player of the Year as a senior in 1999.  Johnson chose to the University of Cincinnati and would play for coach Bob Huggins alongsideSteven Logan and future NBA players Kenyon Martin and Kenny Satterfield. The 1999–2000 Cincinnati Bearcats men's basketball team were one of the nation's most talented teams, spending the majority of the season ranked No. 1 before Kenyon Martin injured his knee in the conference tournament and cut short what could have been a deep March Madness run by the Bearcats. Johnson was a one and done and would declare for the NBA draft after his lone season at Cincinnati.

Professional career
Johnson was selected sixth overall by the Atlanta Hawks in the 2000 NBA Draft. In two seasons with the Hawks, he averaged 6.7 points and 2.8 rebounds per game. On September 13, 2002, Johnson's blue Mercedes-Benz S600 crashed into a tree and caught fire; one of three occupants, none of whom were determined to be driving, he cracked four vertebrae in his neck, nearly causing paralysis. Fitted to a halo brace during his recovery, Johnson was subsequently sidelined for the entire 2002-03 NBA season, and questions surfaced regarding him ever playing again. Johnson's miraculous return to the league began in October 2003 when he signed with the Phoenix Suns only to be waived two weeks later without ever having played a game for them. He then moved on to the American Basketball Association's Long Beach Jam where he played 19 games, before rejoining the NBA, signing a contract with the New York Knicks. The following season, in 2004-05, Johnson rejuvenated his career with the Denver Nuggets, participating in 71 games, and averaging 7.1 points on 49.9 percent field goal shooting.  During the 2005-06 and 2006-07 seasons, Johnson averaged 5 points on 40 percent shooting in 97 games.

Johnson reportedly signed with Italian team Pallacanestro Treviso in August 2007, but quickly jumped back to the NBA Development League's San Antonio affiliate Austin Toros. Johnson averaged 15.8 points and 6 rebounds in 10 games with the Toros.  On December 29 he signed with the San Antonio Spurs after they waived rarely used rookie combo guard Marcus Williams. But on January 7, 2008, Johnson was released from San Antonio Spurs. He was again re-signed by the Spurs, in April. In total, Johnson only played 5 games with the Spurs. His final NBA game was played on April 13th, 2008 in a 85 - 106 loss to the Los Angeles Lakers. In his final game, he recorded 3 points, 1 rebound, 1 assist and 1 steal.  

In October 2010 Johnson signed with Hekmeh in Lebanon. Johnson then signed with the Colombian League team Bukaros in September 2011. In 2012, he played for Barako Bull Energy in the Philippines. He then played in Argentina and Venezuela.

Johnson competes for Team City of Gods in The Basketball Tournament. He was a forward on the 2015 team who made it to the semifinals, losing to Overseas Elite 84-71.

Coaching career
On January 25, 2017, the University of Cincinnati hired Johnson as a student assistant coach for the men's basketball team while Johnson completed his unfinished degree, which he did in 2019. 

In May 2021, Johnson returned to his alma mater to serve as the director of player development for the men's basketball program under coach Wes Miller.

Midway through the 2022–23 season on January 16, 2023, Johnson was announced as an assistant coach under his former college coach Bob Huggins at West Virginia.

NBA career statistics

Regular season 

|-
| align="left" | 2000–01
| align="left" | Atlanta
| 78 || 21 || 16.8 || .374 || .323 || .736 || 2.3 || .8 || .6 || .4 || 5.1
|-
| align="left" | 2001–02
| align="left" | Atlanta
| 72 || 46 || 24.0 || .396 || .360 || .810 || 3.4 || 1.1 || .9 || .8 || 8.4
|-
| align="left" | 2003–04
| align="left" | New York
| 21 || 1 || 13.7 || .371 || .361 || .903 || 1.9 || .5 || .4 || .3 || 5.4
|-
| align="left" | 2004–05
| align="left" | Denver
| 71 || 40 || 17.4 || .499 || .358 || .792 || 2.1 || 1.1 || .6 || .3 || 7.1
|-
| align="left" | 2005–06
| align="left" | Denver
| 58 || 21 || 15.9 || .431 || .350 || .810 || 1.7 || .9 || .4 || .4 || 6.1
|-
| align="left" | 2006–07
| align="left" | Denver
| 39 || 7 || 10.7 || .325 || .216 || .762 || 1.5 || .4 || .4 || .3 || 3.5
|-
| align="left" | 2007–08
| align="left" | San Antonio
| 5 || 0 || 5.6 || .500 || .333 || .000 || .2 || .2 || .2 || .0 || 3.4
|- class="sortbottom"
| style="text-align:center;" colspan="2"| Career
| 344 || 136 || 17.2 || .411 || .336 || .789 || 2.2 || .9 || .6 || .4 || 6.2

Playoffs 

|-
| align="left" | 2004
| align="left" | New York
| 3 || 0 || 5.7 || .000 || .000 || .000 || .7 || .7 || .0 || .3 || .0
|-
| align="left" | 2005
| align="left" | Denver
| 4 || 2 || 19.5 || .550 || .364 || 1.000 || 2.0 || .8 || .5 || .5 || 7.3
|-
| align="left" | 2006
| align="left" | Denver
| 3 || 0 || 11.3 || .231 || .100 || .000 || 3.3 || .7 || .0 || .3 || 2.3
|- class="sortbottom"
| style="text-align:center;" colspan="2"| Career
| 10 || 2 || 12.9 || .368 || .208 || 1.000 || 2.0 || .7 || .2 || .4 || 3.6

References

External links
DerMarr Johnson NBA.com Profile
DerMarr Johnson stats
DerMarr Johnson on MySpace
Boss Slim on MySpace

1980 births
Living people
American expatriate basketball people in Argentina
American expatriate basketball people in China
American expatriate basketball people in Italy
American expatriate basketball people in Lebanon
American expatriate basketball people in Mexico
American expatriate basketball people in the Philippines
American expatriate basketball people in Venezuela
American men's basketball players
Atlanta Hawks draft picks
Atlanta Hawks players
Barako Bull Energy players
Basketball players from Washington, D.C.
Big3 players
Cincinnati Bearcats men's basketball players
Denver Nuggets players
Fuerza Regia de Monterrey players
Guaros de Lara (basketball) players
Jiangsu Dragons players
Leones de Ponce basketball players
Libertad de Sunchales basketball players
Long Beach Jam players
Maine Central Institute alumni
McDonald's High School All-Americans
New York Knicks players
Pallacanestro Treviso players
Parade High School All-Americans (boys' basketball)
Philippine Basketball Association imports
San Antonio Spurs players
Shooting guards
Small forwards
Sagesse SC basketball players
American men's 3x3 basketball players